Howard Webster Byers (December 25, 1856 – March 24, 1928) was an American lawyer and politician.

Born in Woodstock, Richland County, Wisconsin, Byers moved with his parents to Hancock County, Iowa. Byers was educated in the public schools in Wisconsin and Iowa. Byers read law and was admitted to the Iowa bar in 1888. He practiced law in Harlan, Iowa. From 1894 to 1898 and from 1900 to 1902, Byers served in the Iowa House of Representatives and was a Republican. He also served as speaker of the house. Then from 1907 to 1909, Byers served as Iowa Attorney General. He moved in Des Moines, Iowa. Byers died at a hospital in Des Moines, Iowa.

Notes

1856 births
1928 deaths
People from Richland County, Wisconsin
People from Harlan, Iowa
Politicians from Des Moines, Iowa
Iowa lawyers
Republican Party members of the Iowa House of Representatives
Speakers of the Iowa House of Representatives
Iowa Attorneys General
19th-century American lawyers